Amayé-sur-Seulles (literally Amayé on Seulles) is a commune in the Calvados department in the Normandy region of northwestern France.

The inhabitants of the commune are known as Amayéens or Amayéennes

Geography
Amayé-sur-Seulles is located four kilometres west of Villers-Bocage and 20 kilometres south of Bayeux in the Seulles valley. It can be accessed by road D71 coming west from Villers-Bocage through the heart of the commune and village and continuing west to Caumont-l'Evente. The road D193 running west from Cahagnes to Villers-Bocage forms the southern boundary of the commune. The road D215 also starts from the hamlet of Saint-German in the commune and runs south-west to Tracy-Bocage. There are also many small country roads in the commune. In addition to the village there are also the hamlets of Saint-German to the east and La Vallee to the north of the village. The commune consists entirely of farmland.

La Seulles river passes through the northern part of the commune and Le Calichon which forms the northern boundary of the commune flows into it. Another stream which rises near the village flows north forming part of the eastern boundary of the commune and also joins La Seulles. In the south-east the Ruisseau du Caudray forms the south-eastern boundary of the commune and flows eastwards to join La Seulline river. The Ruisseau de Pont Chouquet flows into the Caudray and forms part of the eastern boundary of the commune.

Heraldry

Administration

List of Successive Mayors of Amayé-sur-Seulles

Population

Sites and Monuments
The Church of Saint-Vigor (15th century) belonged to the Abbey of Cerisy. It contains two items which are registered as historical objects:
A Statue: Virgin and child (16th century)
A Retable: Virgin and child (18th century)
The Chateau of Bosq (18th century)
The Clos d'Orval cider farm with an exhibition of old cider-making equipment.

See also
Communes of the Calvados department

References

External links
Amayé-sur-Seulles on the old National Geographic Institute website 
Amayé-sur-Seulles on Géoportail, National Geographic Institute (IGN) website 
Amayé on the 1750 Cassini Map

Communes of Calvados (department)